A Red Mass is a Mass celebrated annually in the Roman Catholic Church for all members of the legal profession, regardless of religious affiliation: judges, lawyers, law school professors, law students, and government officials, marking the opening of the judicial year. Through prayerful petition and thanksgiving the Red Mass requests guidance from the Holy Spirit for all who seek justice, and offers the legal community an opportunity to reflect on the power and responsibility of all in the legal profession.

Originating in Europe during the High Middle Ages, the Red Mass is so-called from the red vestments traditionally worn in symbolism of the tongues of fire (the Holy Spirit) that descended on the Apostles at Pentecost. Its name also exemplifies the scarlet robes worn by royal judges that attended the Mass centuries ago.

In many countries with a Protestant tradition, such as England and Wales and Australia, a similar church service is held to mark the start of the legal year, with judges customarily wearing their ceremonial regalia.

History
The first recorded Red Mass was celebrated in the Cathedral of Paris in 1245. In certain localities of France, the Red Mass was celebrated in honor of Saint Ives, the Patron Saint of Lawyers. From there, it spread to most European countries. The tradition began in England around 1310, during the reign of Edward II. It was attended at the opening of each term of Court by all members of the Bench and Bar. Today the Red Mass is celebrated annually at Westminster Cathedral.

In the United States, the first Red Mass was held in 1877 at Saints Peter and Paul Church Detroit, Michigan, by Detroit College, as the University of Detroit Mercy was known at the time.  UDM School of Law resumed the tradition beginning in 1912 and continues to hold it annually.  In New York City, a Red Mass was first held in 1928 at the Church of St. Andrew, near the courthouses of Foley Square, celebrated by Cardinal Patrick Joseph Hayes, who strongly advocated and buttressed the legal community's part in evangelization.

In Canada, the Red Mass was first celebrated in Quebec City in 1896, in Toronto in 1924 and in Montreal in 1944.  Its sponsorship was assumed by the Guild of Our Lady of Good Counsel in 1931 and by The Thomas More Lawyers' Guild of Toronto since 1968.  It was re-instituted in Sydney, Australia in 1931.

Red Mass today
The main difference between the Red Mass and a traditional Mass is that the focus of prayer and blessings concentrate on the leadership roles of those present. The gifts of the Holy Spirit: wisdom, understanding, counsel and fortitude, are customarily invoked upon those in attendance.

Ireland
In Ireland, the Votive Mass of the Holy Spirit (the Red Mass) is held annually on the first Monday of October, which is the first day of the Michaelmas Law Term. The ceremony is held at St. Michan's Roman Catholic church, which is the parish church of the Four Courts. It is attended by the Irish judiciary, barristers and solicitors, as well as representatives of the diplomatic corps, Gardaí, the Northern Irish, English and Scottish judiciary. The judiciary do not wear their judicial robes, although formal morning dress is worn. Journalist Dearbhail McDonald has described it as "a grave, necessary reminder of the awesome powers and responsibilities of all those who dispense justice, including judges, lawyers, government and gardaí." A parallel ceremony is held at St. Michan's Church of Ireland (Anglican Protestant).

Philippines
In the Philippines, De La Salle University, Xavier University – Ateneo de Cagayan, and other Jesuit schools, and Holy Angel University annually celebrate the Red Mass, which they call "Mass of the Holy Spirit." The University of Santo Tomas,  the Colegio de San Juan de Letran (Dominicans), and the San Beda University (Benedictines)  also celebrate the Red Mass, known as Misa de Apertura, that is followed by the Discurso de Apertura to formally open the academic year.

Scotland
In Scotland, a Red Mass is held annually each autumn in St. Mary's Roman Catholic Cathedral in Edinburgh to mark the beginning of the Scottish Judicial year. It is attended by Roman Catholic judges of the High Court of Justiciary, sheriffs, advocates, solicitors and law students all dressed in their robes of office. The robes of the Lords Commissioner of Justiciary are red faced with white.

United States

One of the better-known Red Masses is the one celebrated each fall at the Cathedral of St. Matthew the Apostle in Washington, D.C. on the Sunday before the first Monday in October (the Supreme Court convenes on the first Monday in October). It is sponsored by the John Carroll Society and attended by some Supreme Court justices, members of Congress, the diplomatic corps, the Cabinet and other government departments and sometimes the President of the United States. Each year, at the Brunch following the Red Mass, the Society confers its Pro Bono Legal Service Awards to thank lawyers and law firms that have provided outstanding service.

Justice Ruth Bader Ginsburg, who was Jewish, used to attend the Red Mass with her Christian colleagues earlier in her tenure on the Court, but later stopped attending due to her objection to the use of images of aborted fetuses during a homily opposing abortion.

The first Red Mass in the United States was celebrated at Saints Peter and Paul Church (Detroit) in 1877, under the auspices of what is now the University of Detroit Mercy. The tradition was resumed in 1912, and has been held annually since. This Red Mass is the oldest continuously held in the United States. The better-known Red Mass in New York was first celebrated in 1928. The first Red Mass in Boston was celebrated on October 4, 1941 at Immaculate Conception Church under the auspices of Boston College. A Red Mass is also celebrated at St. Joseph's Cathedral in the Diocese of Manchester, New Hampshire, at the University of San Diego, and at the Basilica of the Assumption in the Archdiocese of Baltimore. A Red Mass was first observed in Washington, D.C. in 1939 at the National Shrine of the Immaculate Conception. It continued as an annual event there under the auspices of the law school of the Catholic University of America. It was held in January to coincide with the opening of Congress. In 1953 it was moved to St. Matthew's Cathedral, but continued to be held at the beginning of the year until 1977.  The University of Notre Dame ordinarily celebrates a Red Mass in the Basilica of the Sacred Heart each fall semester, at which the bishop of Fort Wayne-South Bend typically presides.

Australia
The St Thomas More Society for Catholic lawyers, founded in Sydney in 1945, holds a Red Mass annually.

See also
 Blue Mass

References

External links

 
 

Mass in the Catholic Church
Catholicism and politics
Religion and politics
Christianity and law
Religion and law
Catholic liturgical law